The University of Illinois at Chicago College of Dentistry evolved from the Columbian Dental College, founded in Chicago in 1891.

The college informally affiliated with the University of Illinois in 1901, and was chartered as an official college of the university in 1913.

Programs 
The college offers a four-year DMD degree, a two and a half year DMD-Advanced Standing, PhD and MS degrees in oral sciences, and six advanced education/residency certificate programs.

The college provides community oral health outreach service and to serving the under-served, providing nearly $1 million in uncompensated care to indigent dental patients annually.  It also provides dental services for senior citizens and children in collaboration with the Chicago Department of Public Health. Faculty and students participate in health fairs and clinics in elementary schools, long-term care facilities, churches, and Head Start programs.  More than 100,000 patients are treated each year in its clinics.

Research 
The college has  research and treatment centers in various specialties: endodontics, oral and maxillofacial surgery, oral biology, oral medicine and diagnostic sciences, orthodontics, pediatric dentistry, periodontics, and restorative dentistry.  The college is home to the Center for Wound Healing and the Brodie Lab for Craniofacial Genetics.

Notable faculty of the past
The college was the top dental school in the United States in the 1930s and 1940s, as several members of dentistry's "Vienna Group," top dental faculty with European backgrounds, including Dr. Harry Sicher and Dr. Joseph-Peter Weinmann, joined its faculty.

Dr. John V. Borden, a 1939 alumnus, was the inventor of the Borden Airotor, a high-speed dental handpiece, the basic tool of modern dentistry.

The research of Dr. Bernard G. Sarnat, a 1940 alumnus, head of the Department of Oral and Maxillofacial Surgery at the college from 1946 to 1956, is considered the basis for the modern understanding of craniofacial surgery.

Dr. Isaac Schour, dean of the college from 1956 to 1964, was the discoverer of "growth rings" in teeth. He and Dr. Maury Massler, who established the college's Department of Pediatric Dentistry and served as its head from 1946 to 1965, created a seminal chart of tooth development.

Faculty members Dr. Earl W. Renfroe, a 1931 alumnus, and Dr. Thomas K. Barber, a 1949 alumnus, wrote what is considered the seminal article originating the concepts of preventive and interceptive orthodontics for the Journal of the American Dental Association in 1957.

Dr. E. Lloyd Du Brul  taught oral anatomy at the college for 50 years. The college's Du Brul Archives Room houses his collection of human, animal, and prehistoric skulls and jawbones.

Dr. Allan G. Brodie Sr., who earned two degrees from the University of Illinois,  established  the college's postgraduate program in orthodontics in his 1929 book, The Dentofacial Complex, which was considered so important that it was republished nearly 30 years after his death.

Notable alumni
 Bernard J. Cigrand, dean, 1903–06 and Father of Flag Day in the United States
 Allan G. Brodie, dean, 1943–56
 G. Walter Dittmar, first president of the Illinois State Dental Society.
 William B. Downs, part of first graduating class of Department of Orthodontics
 E. Lloyd Du Brul, developer of the science of biomechanics of the head and neck
 Elsie Gerlach, first superintendent of the college's Children's Clinic
 Daniel Laskin, director of Department of Oral and Maxillofacial Surgery, 1953–1984
 Maury Massler, established College's Department of Pediatric Dentistry
 Charles G. Maurice, established College's Department of Endodontics
 Frederick B. Moorehead, dean, 1913–24
 Dean Harold Noyes, dean of Oregon Dental School
 Frederick Bogue Noyes, dean, 1924–40
 Earl W. Renfroe, first African-American to head a department at the college
 Isaac Schour, dean, 1956–64
 Stanley D. Tylman, wrote Theory and Practice of Crown and Bridge Prosthesis
 Thaddeus Weclew, helped found the Academy of General Dentistry

Selected research faculty
 Xiaofeng Zhou, Center for Molecular Biology of Oral Diseases

Recent faculty appointments
 Ana Bedran-Russo, restorative dentistry
 Luisa DiPietro, Center for Wound Repair and Tissue Regeneration

See also

American Student Dental Association

References

External links
 University of Illinois at Chicago College of Dentistry

Dental schools in Illinois
Dentistry
Educational institutions established in 1891
1891 establishments in Illinois